Mikhail Youzhny was the defending champion but retired from professional tennis earlier in the year.

Thomas Fabbiano won the title after defeating Prajnesh Gunneswaran 7–6(7–4), 4–6, 6–3 in the final.

Seeds

Draw

Finals

Top half

Bottom half

References
Main Draw
Qualifying Draw

Ningbo Challenger - Singles